The women's section of AC Sparta Praha is a women's football club from Prague, Czech Republic. Together with their local neighbour Slavia, Sparta dominates the national league having won 21 of the 29 titles while Slavia has won the other eight. They have taken part in UEFA competitions several times and got their best result in the 2005–06 UEFA Women's Cup when they reached the quarter-finals, losing over two legs to Djurgården.

Honours

Leagues
In Czechoslovakia
Champions of Czechoslovakia
 Winners(12): 1976, 1977, 1978, 1980, 1981, 1982, 1984, 1985, 1986, 1989, 1990, 1991
In the Czech Republic
Czech Women's First League
 Winners (21): 1994–2002, 2005–2013, 2018, 2019, 2021

Cups
Czech Women's Cup
 Winners (10): 2008, 2009, 2010, 2011, 2012, 2013, 2015, 2017, 2018, 2019

Invitational
 Menton Tournament (1): 1984
 Turbine Hallencup (1): 2019

European Record

 Further details: AC Sparta Prague (women) in European football 

 1 Group stage. Highest-ranked eliminated team in case of qualification, lowest-ranked qualified team in case of elimination.

Current squad
.

Out on loan

Former players

  Pavlína Ščasná
  Lucie Voňková
  Jana Sedláčková
  Iva Mocová
  Andrea Stašková
  Christina Burkenroad
  Lauren Chang
  Kylie Strom
  Lucia Ondrušová
  Jitka Chlastáková
  Markéta Ringelová

Staff 
.

Women's section manager
  Hana Výmolová

Sports secretary 	
  Adéla Pivoňková

Team Manager 	
  Adéla Pivoňková

Manager 	
 Martin Masaryk

Assistant
 Alexandr Samuel

Goalkeeper Coach
  Peter Bartalský

Doctor 	
  Petr Čechal
  Filip Jašek

Physiotherapist 	
  David Leszkow

Fitness Coach 	
  Erik Flámik

Managers
František Müller 
Dušan Žovinec (1988–2012)
Luboš Žovinec (2012–2013)
Jan Podolák (July 2013 – October 2014)
Martin Šeran (October 2014 – June 2015)
Jan Janota (July 2015 – March 2018)
 Peter Bartalský (July 2018 – June 2020)
 Martin Masaryk (June 2020 – present)

References

External links 

Club's website 
Club's website 
Twitter official 
Instagram official 
Instagram unofficial 
Facebook official 
Facebook unofficial 
Club at UEFA.com 
Team at Soccerway.com 
Team Fan site 
Team at SpartaForever.cz 

Women's football clubs in the Czech Republic
Association football clubs established in 1967
AC Sparta Prague
Football clubs in Prague
1967 establishments in Czechoslovakia